Hypidalia sanguirena is a moth of the subfamily Arctiinae first described by William Schaus in 1905. It is found in Brazil, French Guiana, Venezuela, Ecuador and Bolivia.

Subspecies
Hypidalia sanguirena sanguirena (French Guiana)
Hypidalia sanguirena rubrivena Rothschild, 1935 (Brazil)

References

 

Phaegopterina
Moths described in 1905
Moths of South America